Open hand may refer to:
 Open Hand is an American rock band.
 Project Open Hand, a not-for-profit entity
 Open-handed drumming, a method of playing percussion

See also 
 "Hands Open", a song by Snow Patrol